Leo Fong (23 November 1928 – 18 February 2022) was a Chinese-American martial artist, actor, boxer, and Methodist minister who had been making films, acting, and directing since the early 1970s. Fong was still acting in action films right up until his early 90s.

Background
Fong was born on 23 November 1928 in Xinhui county (present Xinhui district of the city of Jiangmen), located in the province of Guangzhou, China. Fong soon relocated to Seattle with his parents and siblings. They were detained for a time, as was common with immigrants from Asia. Upon being released in Seattle, the family traveled to Chicago, where Fong's maternal uncle owned a restaurant in which his father had been guaranteed work. Working at the restaurant, Fong's father saved enough money to purchase a small grocery store in Widener, Arkansas, a small agricultural community. Fong was the victim of racial taunts at school, which often led to fights. Fong eventually took up boxing at age 15.

After graduating from Forrest City High School, Fong attended Hendrix College in Arkansas, where he received a B.A. in physical education. He later received a master's degree in theology from Southern Methodist University. After beginning his career as a Methodist minister, he earned a Master of Social Work from California State University, Sacramento. Fong remained in Northern California, where he continued his martial arts training.

His entry into eastern martial arts began in the 1950s with judo and jiu jitsu. Fong has studied and practiced various martial arts styles until he developed his own style, Wei Kuen Do.

Fong was a friend of martial artist Bruce Lee, who arranged for him to appear on the cover of the tenth anniversary edition of Black Belt magazine.

Film career

1970s
The first film in which he acted was Murder In The Orient (1974), a Filipino martial arts exploitation film that co-starred Ron Marchini and also featured Eva Reyes and Rodolfo 'Boy' Garcia. In 1975, he starred in Bamboo Trap with Filipino actors George Estregan, Chanda Romero, Eddie Garcia, Rez Cortez and Ron van Clief.

Since the late 1970s, Fong has branched out into writing, directing, and producing films. Some of his films in the seventies to mid-'80s featured the same stock of actors,  Cameron Mitchell, Hope Holiday and Stack Pierce.

1980s to 1990s
In Killpoint which was directed by Frank Harris, he played Lt. James Long, an L.A based policeman.  Long teams up with an FBI agent (played by Richard Roundtree) in hunting down the men that stole weapons from the National Guard armory and they stop them from selling them to street gangs. In 1986, he was in another Frank Harris film, Low Blow, that also starred Cameron Mitchell,  Akosua Busia, Stack Pierce and Diane Stevenett and Troy Donahue. Long stars as San Francisco based PI Joe Wong, operating from his untidy office. His mission in that film was to rescue a young heiress from a strange religious cult. The Wong character was reprised for the 1986 film Blood Street which Fong co-directed with George Chung. His services are requested by a woman who walks into his office one day. She needs Wong to find her missing husband Aldo. Wong embarks on a journey though the world of the criminal. Along the way he encounters a father and son team of Solomon and Bones, played by Stack Pierce and Chuck Jeffreys. Wong would appear a third time in Hard Way Heroes that also starred Patrick Johnson, Joseph Guinan and Mel Novak.

Long appeared again in the 1993 film Showdown which was about a Mafia retirement village called Sanctuary which is invaded by a biker gang. Werner Hoetzinger, Michelle McCormick, Richard Lynch and Troy Donaghue also appear in the film.

2000s
A more recent film of his is Transformed, a 2005 film with Christian themes and anti-drug message that featured Tadashi Yamashita and Fred Williamson.He has worked with Williamson on a movie twice prior to this one. The first was the 1978 movie Blind Rage, which followed a group of blind men who rob a bank. As well as acting in Transformed, he also directed and produced it, composed the theme song and was involved in the editing. His latest film work includes Drifter TKD, a 2008 film in which he played Master Lee and The Last Musketeer, which he produced.

Work with Len Kabasinski
Fong co-starred in the 2018 film, Challenge of Five Gauntlets, which was directed by Len Kabasinski. In a review of the film, film reviewer, The Cinema Drunkie gave it a very good review, saying that the move ruled and it was Len's finest work yet!.  There was also the comment on Leo Fong saying the standout had to be the man the myth and Mr Low Blow himself, and how great it was to see him kicking ass again. John M Jerva of Action-Flix.com said that it was a throw back to the great days of the 80's when films of this type swarmed the shelves of the video stores. 
Fong's last role was in another Kabasinski film, Pact of Vengeance which was released in 2022. He played the part of Zian, the owner of Champion's Garage who turns to his old outfit “The Obliterators” to help deal with an extortion gang who have attacked his granddaughter. Jon Mikl Thor, Diamante and Peter Avalon also star in the film. The film was screened in the Dipson Eastern Hills Cinema for the Buffalo Dreams Fantastic Film Festival at 9:30pm on Friday, August 19th, 2022.

Fongsploitation
Over the years, Fongsploitation, a type of Exploitation film subgenre attached to Fong has been noted. In a 2015 review of Enforcer from Death Row, Johnny Larue's Crane Shot refers to the film as " one of the earliest Fongsploitation classics". In a review of Killpoint and Low Blow, the Good Efficiency Butchery review site gave the heading "Retro Review, Special Fongsploitation Edition: KILLPOINT (1984) and LOW BLOW (1986)" for the review of the two films.

Personal life and death
Fong died on 18 February 2022, at the age of 93. He is survived by his wife Minerva, three children, his grandchildren, and his youngest sister.

Selected filmography
Actor

 Murder in the Orient (1974)
 Tiger's Revenge (1975)
 Bamboo Trap (1975)
 Enforcer from Death Row (1976)
 Blind Rage (1978)
 The Last Reunion (1980)
 Killpoint (1984)
 Ninja Assassins (1985)
 24 Hours to Midnight (1985)
 Low Blow (1986)
 Rapid Fire (1988)
 License to Kill (1988)
 Jungle Heat (1988)
 Blood Street (1988)
 Showdown (1993)
 Cage II (1994)
 Carjack (1996)
 Transformed (2005)
 Drifter TKD (2008)
 Thunderkick (2008) 
 The Shadow Boxer (2012)
 Hard Way Heroes (2016)
 Challenge of Five Gauntlets (2018)
 Pact of Vengeance (2022)

Publications
 Choy Lay Fut Kung-Fu by Leo Fong
 Si Lum Kung-Fu: The Chinese art of Self-Defense by Leo Fong
 Power Training in Kung-Fu by Ron Marchini  and Leo Fong

Fighting Style
Wei Kuen Do (Way of the Integrated Fist): A complete system based on its roots in Jeet Kune Do, Serrada Escrima, Western Boxing, Choy Lay Fut, Northern Shaolin, Wrestling, Tae Kwon Do, Karate, Judo, Jujutsu, Arnis, and Wing Chun. As of March 24, 2017 Leo Fong assigned a three-man council to continue promoting and overseeing his art of Wei Kuen Do.  The council members are Jeff Jeds, Klein Buen, and Bong Tumaru.

References

External links
 
 
 
 Black Belt, Nov 1970 acticle: Putting Theory into Practice: Leo Fong's Eclectic System of Self Defense By C. Morgan
 Black Belt, Nov 1976 article: The Chinese Minister from Arkansas Who Makes Martial Arts Movies By Peter Koenig
 Grandmaster Leo Fong vintage footage

1928 births
2022 deaths
Male actors from Arkansas
American male film actors
American martial artists
American martial arts writers
American Methodist clergy
Chinese emigrants to the United States
Republic of China (1912–1949) emigrants to the United States
American sportspeople of Chinese descent
Martial arts school founders
People from Xinhui District
California State University, Sacramento alumni
Hendrix College alumni
Southern Methodist University alumni